Bruno Giglio de Oliveira (born 20 August 1985 in São Vicente), commonly known as Oliveira, is a Brazilian central defender who plays for Inter de Limeira.

Career
On 1 July 2013, Oliveira signed a contract with Bulgarian side Chernomorets Burgas as a free agent.

References

External links

1985 births
Living people
Brazilian footballers
Brazilian expatriate footballers
Expatriate footballers in Portugal
Expatriate footballers in Bulgaria
Liga Portugal 2 players
First Professional Football League (Bulgaria) players
Maltese Premier League players
Mogi Mirim Esporte Clube players
Red Bull Brasil players
C.D. Feirense players
PFC Chernomorets Burgas players
Treze Futebol Clube players
Ypiranga Futebol Clube players
Tarxien Rainbows F.C. players
Balzan F.C. players
Associação Atlética Internacional (Limeira) players
Expatriate footballers in Malta
Association football central defenders
People from São Vicente, São Paulo
Footballers from São Paulo (state)